was the seventeenth of the sixty-nine stations of the Nakasendō. It is located in the present-day city of Annaka, Gunma Prefecture, Japan.

History
Sakamoto-shuku is located at the eastern entrance to the Usui Pass. During the Edo period, there were a total of four honjin and sub-honjin combined. There were an additional 40 other buildings for travelers to use, making it a comparatively large station along the Nakasendō.

Neighboring post towns
Nakasendō
Matsuida-shuku - Sakamoto-shuku - Karuisawa-shuku

References

Stations of the Nakasendō
Post stations in Gunma Prefecture